Károly Bajkó (1 August 1944 – 9 June 1997) was a Hungarian wrestler. He was born in Békés. He was Olympic bronze medalist in Greco-Roman wrestling in 1968, and in Freestyle wrestling in 1972.

References

External links 
 
 

1944 births
1997 deaths
People from Békés
Hungarian male sport wrestlers
Olympic wrestlers of Hungary
Wrestlers at the 1964 Summer Olympics
Wrestlers at the 1968 Summer Olympics
Wrestlers at the 1972 Summer Olympics
Olympic bronze medalists for Hungary
Olympic medalists in wrestling
Medalists at the 1968 Summer Olympics
Medalists at the 1972 Summer Olympics
Sportspeople from Békés County
20th-century Hungarian people